Ernest I or Ernst I can refer to:
 Ernest I, Duke of Swabia (reigned 1012–15)
 Ernest I, Prince of Anhalt-Dessau (died 1516)
 Ernest I, Duke of Brunswick-Lüneburg (1497–1546), Ernest the Confessor
 Ernst I, Duke of Saxe-Coburg-Altenburg (1601–1675), Ernest the Pious
 Ernst I, Duke of Saxe-Coburg and Gotha (1784–1844), father of Prince Albert, the consort of Queen Victoria
 Ernst I, Prince of Hohenlohe-Langenburg (1794–1860)